Seroglazovo is a rural locality (a settlement) in Volensky Selsoviet, Kharabalinsky District, Astrakhan Oblast, Russia. The population was 490 as of 2010. There are 7 streets.

Geography 
Seroglazovo is located 54 km southeast of Kharabali (the district's administrative centre) by road. Volnoye is the nearest rural locality.

References 

Rural localities in Kharabalinsky District